Marakkala is the modern colloquial term for Muslims, although Marakkalage is another uniquely Karava ancestral name and is also used by several traditional Karava families of Sri Lanka to date.

The name  derives from the type of craft Marakkar (referring to wooden ships in Tamil) used in trade and warfare by the rulers of the Kuru Mandala coast, the region of the Kurus, and Sri Lanka. This may be an allusion to the Muslim Arab traders who were the prominent seamen of pre- and early colonial Sri Lanka. They were also used in naval battles against the Portuguese, Dutch, British and other Europeans in the 16th, 17th and 18th centuries.  The ancestors of the families bearing these names may have been Muslim traders or the owners or commanders of such vessels.

The Karavas claim to be the traditional martial and naval community of Sri Lanka and the preservation of that naval tradition in such mediaeval names is of interest.

A stamp issued by India shows the Marakkar , a boat that could carry 30-40 men and be sailed or rowed in the sea as well as through lagoons and narrow waters. These crafts and the more ancient  were also used in naval battles against the Portuguese in the 16th century.

See also 
 Timeline of the Karavas
 Karaiyar
 Karava heraldry

References

Queyroz Fr. The Temporal and Spiritual Conquest of Ceylaö,

External links
Karava web site - Kshatriya Maha Sabha Sri Lanka

Sinhalese castes